Carlos Alvarado Lang (January 14, 1905 – September 3, 1961) was a Mexican printmaker and professor. He taught metal engraving and later served as the program director at Academy of San Carlos, from 1929 to 1949.

Biography 
Carlos Alvarado Lang was born January 14, 1905, in La Piedad de Cabadas, Michoacán, Mexico. When he was age 14, he began his studies in the National School of Fine Arts (Escuela Nacional de Artes Plásticas de la Universidad Nacional autónomae México).

Alvarado Lang studied printmaking under engraver Emiliano Valadéz at the Academy of San Carlos (Spanish: Academia de San Carlos, also Escuela Nacional de San Carlos) in Mexico City. In 1929, he followed Emiliano Valadéz on his chair. After the coursework offer at the Academy of San Carlos was expanded in 1930, he got the chair of metal engraving. From 1942 to 1949 he was director of the Academy of San Carlos. He had many notable students, including Lola Cueto.

Posthumously his works were exhibited at the Escuela Nacional de Pintura, Escultura y Grabado "La Esmeralda" (1963); in the Museo de Arte Moderno (1971); the museum of the Palacio de Bellas Artes (1981); and in further notable institutions.

Collections 
Alvarado Lang's work is in many public museum collections, including:

References

External links 
 Archive of website CarlosAlvaradoLang.com, in Spanish

Mexican engravers
Academic staff of the National Autonomous University of Mexico
Mexican printmakers
People from La Piedad
Artists from Michoacán
1905 births
1961 deaths
20th-century engravers
Academic staff of Escuela Nacional de Pintura, Escultura y Grabado "La Esmeralda"